Maria Carolina Álvares Ferraz (born January 25, 1968) is a Brazilian actress, TV host, and former model.

TV roles

 2016 - Haja Coração as Penélope Bacellar Vélazquez
 2013 - Além do Horizonte as Tereza
 2012 - Avenida Brasil as Alexia Bragança
 2011 - O Astro as Amanda
 2011 - Amor em quatro atos as Maria
 2010 - Na Forma da Lei as Maria Clara Viegas
 2009 - Exagerados
 2008 - Beleza Pura as Norma Gusmão
 2007 - A Diarista as Sônia Laura
 2007 - Casseta & Planeta as Flight attendant
 2005 - Belíssima as Rebeca Cavalcanti
 2004 - Começar de Novo as Gisela Manhães
 2003 - Kubanacan as Rubi Calderon
 2002 - Sabor da Paixão as Clarissa Vidigal
 2002 - O Quinto dos Infernos (miniseries) as Naomi
 2001 - Estrela-Guia as Vanessa Rios
 1998 - Pecado Capital as Lucinha (Lucy Jordan)
 1997 - Por Amor as Milena Barros Motta
 1995 - História de Amor as Paula Sampaio Moretti
 1994 - Pátria Minha as Beatriz
 1994 - Tropicaliente
 1993 - O Mapa da Mina as Bruna Torres de Almeida Lovatelli
 1991 - O fantasma da ópera (miniseries) as Cristina Andreati
 1991 - Floradas na Serra (miniseries) as Lucília
 1990 - Escrava Anastácia (miniseries) as Sinhá
 1990 - Pantanal as Young Irma

Filmography
2006 - O passageiro - Segredos de adulto
2001 - Amores possíveis
2000 - Mater Dei
1993 - Alma corsária

References

External links

Brazilian television actresses
Brazilian telenovela actresses
Brazilian female models
Brazilian female dancers
Brazilian television presenters
1968 births
Living people
People from Goiás
Brazilian women television presenters